Ernâni Rodrigues Lopes (20 February 1942 Lisbon – 2 December 2010) was a Portuguese economist and politician. He served as Portugal's Minister of Finance from 1983 until 1985 in the government of former Prime Minister Mário Soares.

Ernâni Lopes died of lymphoma in Lisbon, Portugal, on 2 December 2010, at the age of 68.

References

1942 births
2010 deaths
Finance ministers of Portugal
Government ministers of Portugal
20th-century Portuguese economists
Technical University of Lisbon alumni
People from Lisbon
Grand Crosses 1st class of the Order of Merit of the Federal Republic of Germany
Deaths from cancer in Portugal
Deaths from lymphoma